Robinja (English translation: Slave) is the thirteenth studio album of Bosnian singer Halid Bešlić. It was released in 1998.

Track listing
Svatovi (Nutpials)
Robinja (Slave)
Ranjen sam ti (I'm Wounded for You)
Tajna (Secret)
Žena mog života (Woman of my Life)
Jesen u meni (Autumn Inside of Me)
Plavuše (Blonde Woman)
Odlazim (I'm Leaving)
Željan sam željan (I'm Craving, I'm Craving)
Rajske ptice (Birds of Paradise)

References

Halid Bešlić albums
1999 albums
Nimfa Sound albums